Ainu Mosir is a 2020 Japanese drama film directed by Takeshi Fukunaga. It features a story about a young Ainu boy, and deals with issues around the conflict between his personal thoughts, modern Japan, and the way of his traditional Ainu heritage. The film featured as a premier at the Tribeca Film Festival.

Production 
The movie was filmed on location in Hokkaido, Japan in 2020. The film runs for 84 minutes.

Plot 
Kanto is a 14-year-old Ainu boy living in a small town in Hokkaido. His mother runs an Ainu gift shop after his father’s death. Kanto is disgruntled with life in the town and wishes to move away from it to a big modern city, away from his Ainu heritage. The town itself is a traditional Ainu community, essentially carrying on the traditions and surviving through the tourism industry.

After the death of his father, he is taken under the wing of an Ainu Elder, Debo (Debo Akibe), a friend of his father's, who shows him the ways of the Ainu. The Ainu residents are bringing back a lost tradition called Iomante, a controversial ritual killing of a bear, which some of them agree with and others see as a practice that should be changed. Around this time, Kanto discovers a bear in the forest. A Japanese journalist (Lily Franky) visits, interviewing the Ainu people about the current situation, including the Iomante ritual. Kanto keeps visiting the bear in the forest, befriends it, and then has to decide how he feels about the bear killing, ultimately coming to the conclusion that he does not agree with it.

Kanto finds videotapes of the Iomante rituals and watches them. He begins to discover more about his culture, including some of the more mystical elements, and eventually comes to appreciate some of the rituals.

Cast 
 Kanto - Kanto Shimokura
 Debo - Debo Akibe
 Emi - Emi Shimokura
 Japanese journalist - Lily Franky

Awards and film festivals 

Ainu Mosir received a number of nominations, and won two awards:

 Guanajuato International Film Festival 2020 - winner - best International Feature competition
 Hainan International Film Festival 2020 - nominee - Future New Talent Award
 Hong Kong Asian Film Festival 2020 - New Talent Award
 Image Awards (NAACP) 2021 - nominee - Outstanding International Motion Picture
 Nippon Connection Japanese Film Festival 2021 - nominee - Visions Jury award and Audience award
 Taipei Film Festival 2020 - nominee - New Talent award
 Tribeca Film Festival 2020 - Special Jury Mention

References

External links 
 

2020 films
2020 drama films
2020s Japanese-language films
Japanese drama films
American drama films
Chinese drama films
Films set in Hokkaido
Ainu in fiction
2020s American films